Tawau Airport  is an airport located  north east of Tawau, Sabah, Malaysia. It is one of two airports in Sabah with immigration counters for international flights, the other being Kota Kinabalu International Airport. Tawau Airport serves the districts of Tawau, Kunak and Semporna and is the nearest airport to the diving islands of Sipadan, Mabul and Kapalai, all of which are located in the latter district.

Old airport
In 1951, the government of British North Borneo approved the plan to construct an aerodrome in Tawau.

The Tawau Airstrip was opened in 1953, located in Jalan Utara (Malay for 'Northern Road'), about  outside the town centre. The first flight was commenced on 24 September 1953, with twice weekly flights from Sandakan by Sabah Airways Limited operated by a de Havilland Dragon Rapide aircraft. In 1954, the route was added by an intermediate stop in Lahad Datu following the completion of the Lahad Datu airstrip.

By the end of the decade, the airport was primarily served by Borneo Airways via a Scottish Aviation Twin Pioneer aircraft, linking the town to Lahad Datu, Sandakan and Jesselton. Increasing air travel demand by the beginning of 1960s witnessed an extension of the runway, from 2,400 feet of coral to 4,500 feet of gravel, which enable the arrival of a daily scheduled service to Jesselton using a larger Douglas DC-3 by August 1962. A new larger terminal was officially opened in 1968 by the then Transport Minister of Malaysia, Tan Sri Haji Sardon. It could only cater to regional aircraft such as the Fokker 27. From the 1970s, the airport has begun serving international destinations to Balikpapan and Tarakan via Bouraq Indonesian Airlines, the flights to Indonesia were operated 3 times a week by the airline in the early 1970s.

In October 1981, following the completion of works to extend the runway length to 5,600 feet as well as enlarge the parking apron and terminal building, the airport saw the commencement of Malaysia Airlines' Boeing B737-200 operations. The airport also received further additional direct international destination from Sultan Hasanuddin International Airport in Indonesia by Merpati Nusantara Airlines in 1995 due to the close socio-economic ties between Tawau and Makassar.

On 15 September 1995, Malaysia Airlines Flight 2133, a flight from Kota Kinabalu operated by a Fokker 50 aircraft, touched down  before the end of the -long runway. While attempting a go-around, the aircraft crashed into an informal settlement in Kampung Seri Menanti. There were 34 fatalities, including two crewmembers. In October 2001, another Malaysia Airlines flight (this one operated by a Boeing 737-400) skidded off the runway without causing any injuries or fatalities.

A survey found that the old Tawau Airport had one of the shortest runways in Malaysia. The airport's runway would need to be extended (or a new airport built) to safely accommodate larger aircraft.

Present
The new Tawau Airport was opened to the public in December 2001. Direct flights to Kuala Lumpur was introduced a year later in 2002 and Johor Bahru in 2006.  In 2003, it was officially opened by the then Transport Minister of Malaysia, Tun Dr. Ling Liong Sik. With a capacity of over 1.4 million passengers per annum, it is the second largest airport in Sabah after Kota Kinabalu International Airport. AirAsia added an international destination to Singapore in 2010 and domestically to Kuching in 2018, although both were discontinued due to weak passenger yields. In 2018, 1,642,171 passengers passed through the airport and there were 15,579 aircraft movements.

At present, Tawau Airport has a -long runway, namely runway 06/24. Runway 24 is equipped with Instrument Landing System (ILS). The -storey terminal building is equipped with two aerobridges. The airport can accommodate eight aircraft at any given time, and its car park can accommodate 500 vehicles. In addition, there is a police station opposite the terminal building. The new facilities also enabled night operations to be conducted, compared to the old airport that have limited capabilities on its runway.

In 2019, Tony Fernandes, the CEO of AirAsia Group is planning to connect Tawau with direct flight services to several cities in China, Korea, Japan and other Asean cities by 2020 due to its proximity with Tun Sakaran Marine Park, Mabul, Sipadan island, Maliau Basin, Danum Valley and other major ecotourism sites in southeast Sabah. Prior to the pandemic, the airport actively handled international flights to Tarakan, Indonesia and Bandar Seri Begawan, Brunei by MASWings and RB Link. There was also a planned charter flights to Guangzhou originally scheduled by Hainan Airlines by 2020. Earlier, Assafal P Alian, the Sabah Deputy Minister of Tourism and Culture and Environment, has purposed on flight resumption between Tawau and Makassar due to strong demand for the route. While in Indonesia, the head of Nunukan Deputy for Infrastructure has also requested a direct air link between Nunukan and Tawau after recording healthy annual passenger and cargo maritime traffic, with 30,000 passengers commuting between the two areas per-month. 
 
The airport is also slated for a further expansion after registering 1.64 million passengers in 2018, surpassing its original capacity of 1.4 million users. With 19.4% growth in 2018, it is the fourth in terms of passenger growth in the country (after Kuala Lumpur, Kota Kinabalu and Penang International Airport). The expansion is expected to commenced by the end of 2019, allowing the airport to handle 2.5 million passengers annually with an upgrade to the existing facilities together with a better shopping experience.

In 2021, due to the pandemic which has caused supply chain export disruption for Tawau, Maskargo launched seasonal twice weekly flights to Hong Kong using an Airbus A330-300 from Malaysia Airlines that has been converted to P2Cargo configuration.

As of 2022, Tawau Airport is yet to solve its ongoing capacity issues. Issues ranging from lack of immigration lanes, limited available seats for passengers to wait at the terminal area to limited aircraft bays during peak hours has caused unnecessary congestion. Lobby for airport expansion has been sought by local politicians and Malaysian Airports over the years but nothing has been approved by the Ministry of Transport. A study from MAVCOM in 2019 has shown that Tawau airport was operating at an excess 130% of its capacity. This was caused by the surge of domestic air travel that has resulted in increased flight frequencies, along with Tawau being the sole feeder for tourists getting to Semporna while no capacity adjustment has been done on the airport to cater this over the years.

Airlines and destinations

Cargo

Traffic and statistics

Traffic

Statistics

See also

 Indonesia–Malaysia confrontation
 Far East Air Force (Royal Air Force)
 List of former Royal Air Force stations

References

External links

Tawau Airport, Sabah at Malaysia Airports Holdings Berhad

Tawau
Airports in Sabah